Roches Noires may refer to:

Places

Morocco 
 Roches Noires, Morocco, an arrondissement of eastern Casablanca, in the Aïn Sebaâ - Hay Mohammadi district of the Grand Casablanca region of Morocco.

Mauritius 
Roches Noires, Mauritius, a village in the district of Rivière du Rempart, Mauritius